"In My System" is a single by recording artist Tinchy Stryder. It was the first single from his third studio album Third Strike. It was released on 8 August 2010 as a digital download and on 9 August 2010 as a CD single. The single features uncredited vocals from co-writer Ayak Thiik.

Critical reception
Robert Copsey of Digital Spy gave the song a positive review stating: "[Stryder's] latest effort picks up smoothly where last year's 'You're Not Alone' left off. Thankfully, its combination of relatable rhymes and hazy summer synths ensure his formula remains both timely and fresh, resulting in another surefire radio smash."

Music video
A music video was made for the single and was filmed in Barbados and features label-mate and good friend Jodie Connor. It premiered on Tinchy Stryder's YouTube channel on 28 June 2010.

Track listing

Chart performance
"In My System" charted at number 10 on the UK Singles Chart on 15 August 2010, becoming Tinchy Stryder's fourth UK top 10 hit and number 3 on the UK Dance Chart.

Release history

References

2010 singles
Takeover Entertainment singles
Tinchy Stryder songs
Songs with music by Tinchy Stryder
Song recordings produced by Fraser T. Smith
Songs written by Ayak Thiik
2010 songs